Roman Vashchenko (born December 8, 2000, in Bila Tserkva, Kyiv Oblast, Ukraine) is a Ukrainian male artistic gymnast and member of the national team.

Career
He became European champion in team competition at the 2020 European championships in Mersin, Turkey.

Competitive history

References

External links 
 

2000 births
Living people
Ukrainian male artistic gymnasts
People from Bila Tserkva
Sportspeople from Kyiv Oblast
European champions in gymnastics
21st-century Ukrainian people